Suboestophora is a genus of air-breathing land snail, a terrestrial pulmonate gastropod mollusk in the family Trissexodontidae, within the Helicoidea. It is found in Spain.

Species 
Species within the genus Suboestophora include:
 Suboestophora altamirai (Ortiz de Zárate López, 1962)
 Suboestophora boscae (Hidalgo, 1869)
 Suboestophora ebria Corbella i Alonso, 2004
 Suboestophora gasulli (Ortiz de Zárate Rocandio & Ortiz de Zárate López, 1961) (synonym: Gasullia gasulli (Ortiz de Zárate Rocandio & Ortiz de Zárate López, 1961))
 Suboestophora hispanica (Gude, 1910) - type species
 Suboestophora jeresae (Ortiz de Zárate López, 1962)
 Suboestophora kuiperi (Gasull, 1966)
 Suboestophora tarraconensis (Aguilar-Amat, 1935)

References 

Trissexodontidae
Taxonomy articles created by Polbot